Dušan Bakić (born 23 February 1999) is a Montenegrin professional footballer who plays as a forward for Belarusian Premier League club Dinamo Minsk and the Montenegro national team.

International career
Bakić debuted internationally for the senior side of Montenegro on 17 November 2022 at Podgorica City Stadium in a 2–2 tie against Slovakia, when he came on as a replacement for Marko Vešović, who was booked with a yellow card after 57 minutes of play. Three days later, he collected his second cap against Slovenia in a 0–1 away defeat.

References

External links 
 
 

1999 births
Living people
Footballers from Podgorica
Association football midfielders
Montenegrin footballers
Montenegro under-21 international footballers
Montenegro international footballers
FK Budućnost Podgorica players
FC Energetik-BGU Minsk players
FC Dinamo Minsk players
Tallinna JK Legion players
Montenegrin First League players
Belarusian Premier League players
Montenegrin expatriate footballers
Expatriate footballers in Belarus
Expatriate footballers in Estonia
Montenegrin expatriate sportspeople in Belarus